Francisco Alomar (23 December 1928 – 9 August 1955) was a Spanish racing cyclist. He rode in the 1954 Tour de France.

References

External links
 

1928 births
1955 deaths
Spanish male cyclists
Sportspeople from Mallorca
Cyclists from the Balearic Islands